You Know I Know is the sixth studio album by English singer-songwriter Olly Murs, released on November 9, 2018 through RCA and Sony. It is a double album, consisting of new songs (I Know) and a selection of greatest hits (You Know). The album was certified Gold by the British Phonographic Industry (BPI) in mid-December 2018. Murs toured in May and June 2019 in support of the album. This was Murs's final album under RCA Records.

Background
Murs announced the album on his Twitter and that it would be available to preorder from 5 October 2018. "You Know I Know" is a Double Album, The first disc includes 14 new songs including the lead single "Moves" written by Ed Sheeran and featuring Snoop Dogg and the title track featuring Shaggy. "Moves" also features in the film Johnny English Strikes Again.
Murs worked with producers and songwriters Steve Mac and Steve Robson along with songwriter Wayne Hector on the album. Along with working with Snoop Dogg on "Moves" and Shaggy on the title track, Murs recruited Nile Rodgers to contribute guitar to the song "Feel the Same".

Promotion

Singles
"Moves" was released as the lead single from the album on 28 September 2018. It features American rapper Snoop Dogg and appeared in the film Johnny English Strikes Again.

Promotional singles
"Take Your Love" was released as first promotional single on 26 October 2018 with an audio video uploaded the same day. "Mark on My Heart" was uploaded as a second promotional single on 2 November 2018. "Excuses" was released as fourth promotional single  4 December 2018. The album's fifth promotional single "Feel the Same" was released on 22 March 2019.

Tour

Murs announced a 2019 UK and Ireland arena tour on 9 October 2018. The tour originally had 16 dates, which went on sale on 12 October 2018. On 22 October Murs added extra dates in Glasgow, Nottingham and Birmingham. The opening act for the tour will be X Factor alumni Rak-Su.

Set list
This set list is from the concert on 10 May 2019 in Birmingham. It may not represent all shows from the tour.

 "Moves / Shape of You" (Ed Sheeran cover)
"Feel the Same"
"Kiss Me"
"Maria"
"You Don't Know Love (Remix)"
"You Know I Know / It Wasn't Me" (Shaggy cover)
"Talking to Yourself"
"Superstition" (Stevie Wonder cover)
"Thinking of Me"
"What Makes You Beautiful" (One Direction cover)
"I Wan'na Be Like You (The Monkey Song)" (From “The Jungle Book”)
"That Girl"
"Please Don't Let Me Go"
"Heart Skips a Beat / Freed From Desire" (Gala cover)
"Dear Darlin'"
"Up"
"Troublemaker"
"Wrapped Up"
"Dance with Me Tonight"

Tour dates

Track listing

Charts

Weekly charts

Year-end charts

Certifications

References

2018 greatest hits albums
Albums produced by Cutfather
Albums produced by Digital Farm Animals
Albums produced by Jim Eliot
Albums produced by Jordan Riley
Albums produced by Steve Mac
Albums produced by Steve Robson
Albums produced by TMS (production team)
Olly Murs albums
RCA Records albums